The Sirwan River is a river and tributary of the Tigris that originates in Iran as the Sirwan (or Sirvan) River then runs mainly through Eastern Iraq.

Course
It rises near Hamadan, in the Zagros Mountains of Iran. It then descends through the mountains, where for some 32 km it forms the  border between the two countries. It finally feeds into the Tigris below Baghdad. Navigation of the upper reaches of the Diyala is not possible because of its narrow defiles, but the river's valley provides an important trade route between Iran and Iraq.

History
The river is mentioned in Herodotus' Histories under the name Gyndes, where it is stated that the king Cyrus the Great dispersed it by digging 360 channels as punishment after a sacred white horse perished there. The river returned to its former proportions after the channels disappeared under the sand.
The Battle of Diyala River took place in 693 BC between the forces of the Assyrian empire and the Elamites of southern Iran.

Name
Its origin in Kurdish and Persian is called "Sirwan", meaning 'roaring sea' or 'shouting river', as well as being the name of an ancient city near Ilam city in Iran. In the Sassanid and early Islamic periods, the lower course of the river formed part of the Nahrawan Canal. The Diyala Governorate in Iraq is named after the river.

Dams
In Iran the Daryan Dam is currently under construction near Daryan in Kermanshah Province. In Iraq, the river first reaches the Darbandikhan Dam which generates hydroelectric power and stores water for irrigation. It then flows down to the Hemrin Dam for similar purposes. In the lower Diyala Valley near Baghdad the river is controlled by the Diyala Weir which controls floods and irrigates the area northeast of Baghdad.

References

Rivers of Iraq
Rivers of Iran
Tributaries of the Tigris River
International rivers of Asia
Geography of Iraqi Kurdistan
Iranian Kurdistan
Iran–Iraq border
Diyala Governorate
Landforms of Kurdistan Province
Landforms of Kermanshah Province